The 2017 Louisville City FC season was the club's third season in Louisville, Kentucky playing in the United Soccer League, which as of 2017 is one of two second-tier leagues in the United States soccer league system.

The club began their pre-season campaign on March 4 before the league commenced on March 25. They also competed in the U.S. Open Cup.

Louisville City would finish the season on top of the Eastern Conference for the first time in club history and have the second best record in the league overall for the third consecutive year.  They would also win the USL Cup after the season for the club's first title.

Current squad 
Final Roster.

Transfers

In

Out

Competitions

Pre-season

USL

Eastern Conference standings

Results summary

Results

USL Playoffs

Results

U.S. Open Cup 

Louisville City entered the 2017 U.S. Open Cup with the rest of the United Soccer League in the second round.

Player statistics

Top scorers

Assist leaders

Clean sheets

Disciplinary

References 

Louisville
Louisville City FC seasons
Louisville
Louisville City FC